Sagfjord Church is a parish church of the Church of Norway in Hamarøy Municipality in Nordland county, Norway. It is located in the village of Karlsøy on the island of Finnøya. It is one of the churches for the Sagfjord parish which is part of the Ofoten prosti (deanery) in the Diocese of Sør-Hålogaland. The white, wooden church was built in a long church style in 1886 using plans drawn up by the architect S. Mathisen. The church seats about 130 people.

History
The first church on this site was built during the Middle Ages. Not much is known about that building. At some point the church was closed and torn down. In 1885, it was decided to move the old Hamarøy Church from Presteid to the village of Karlsøy on the nearby island of Finnøya. After the move it would be known as the Sagfjord Church. The old church was originally built in 1775 (in Presteid as Hamarøy Church) and in 1840 the church was renovated and repaired.

In 1886, the materials were moved to Karlsøy and rebuilt as the new Sagfjord Church (on the same site as the medieval church that once served this area). The new church is made up of four sections in a row: tower, nave, choir, and sacristy. The main entrance is on top of a steep flight of outside steps at the foot of the tower. Under the tower is an entry porch that also includes stairs up to the 2nd floor seating in a balcony as well as to the clock tower. A set of double doors separates the entry area from the rectangular nave. Beyond the nave is a small, square-shaped choir. Behind the altar panel, is a hidden door which leads to the sacristy which is a smaller square shaped room.

Media gallery

See also
List of churches in Sør-Hålogaland

References

Hamarøy
Churches in Nordland
Wooden churches in Norway
18th-century Church of Norway church buildings
Churches completed in 1775
1886 establishments in Norway
Long churches in Norway